Om Tilla (About Tilla) is a Norwegian drama film from 1963 directed by Arne Skouen. Skouen wrote the screenplay, which was based on his 1959 novel Bare om barn. It contained a series of articles from the newspaper Verdens Gang, in which Skouen pointed out that children with intellectual disabilities and children with behavioral difficulties did not receive sufficient financial support or professional help.

Plot
The child psychologist Ivar visits Tilla's mother, Maria, one day at the Botanical Garden in Oslo. Ivar had Tilla under observation a few months earlier, but Maria did not return with her daughter. The child psychologist manages to persuade Maria to come with Tilla to the children's psychiatric clinic so that they can start treating her. At the clinic, they meet the chief physician Mimi Backer. Tilla has not spoken in a year and a half. In the observation room at the clinic, the first small glimmer of light falls on the mystery. There, the girl builds up her secret world through toys she chooses to express herself.

Cast

 Eva Henning as Maria
 Toralv Maurstad as Ivar
 Wenche Foss as Mimi Backer, the chief physician
 Synne Skouen as Tilla, Maria's daughter
 Egil Lorck as Bernhard, a gardener
 Tore Foss as Haugen, the ship inspector
 Erik Gløersen as Terje
 Johannes Eckhoff as the school psychologist
 Pål Virik as a teenager
 Roy Bjørnstad as a gardener
 Kai Remlov as a teenager
 Bonne Gauguin

References

External links 
 
 Om Tilla at the National Library of Norway
 Om Tilla at the Swedish Film Database

1963 films
Norwegian drama films
1960s Norwegian-language films
Films directed by Arne Skouen
1963 drama films